St. Andrew Bobola Parish - designated for Polish immigrants in Dudley, Massachusetts, United States. Founded in 1963, it is one of the Polish-American Roman Catholic parishes in New England in the Diocese of Worcester.

Bibliography 
 
 The Official Catholic Directory in USA

External links 
 Official Church Website
 St. Andrew Bobola Parish - ParishesOnline.com
 St. Andrew Bobola Parish - TheCatholicDirectory.com 
 Diocese of Worcester

Polish-American Roman Catholic parishes in Massachusetts
Religion in Worcester County, Massachusetts
1963 establishments in Massachusetts
Roman Catholic parishes of Diocese of Worcester